Michael Greif (born ca. 1959 in Brooklyn, New York) is an American stage director. He has won three Obie Awards and received four Tony Award nominations, for Rent, Grey Gardens, Next to Normal, and Dear Evan Hansen.

Career
Greif attended Northwestern University and graduated from the University of California, San Diego graduate directing program. He was the Artistic Director of the La Jolla Playhouse, LaJolla, California from 1994 to 1999.

He was an Artistic Associate at the New York Theatre Workshop where he directed, among others, Bright Lights, Big City (1998–99) and the original production of Rent for which he received the Obie Award for direction of a musical and later directed on Broadway.

Greif has directed six original Broadway musicals and been nominated for the Tony Award for Best Direction of a Musical four times.  In addition to Rent, his Broadway credits include If/Then (also at the National Theatre in Washington, D.C.), Next to Normal (also at Second Stage Theatre and Arena Stage), Grey Gardens (also at Playwrights Horizons), Dear Evan Hansen (also at Arena Stage and Second Stage), and War Paint (also at the Goodman Theatre, Chicago).

Among his many directing credits Off-Broadway are Katori Hall's Our Lady of Kibeho, John Guare's Landscape of the Body and A Few Stout Individuals at Signature Theatre, Beauty of the Father for the Manhattan Theatre Club, the 2009 Playwrights Horizons production of Mrs. Sharp (with music and lyrics by Ryan Scott Oliver and starring Jane Krakowski), and Romeo and Juliet, Winter's Tale, and The Tempest at the New York Shakespeare Festival at the Delacorte Theater (2007, 2010, 2015).

Work (selected)
La Jolla Playhouse
The Three Cuckolds (1986)
What the Butler Saw (play) (1992)
Thérèse Raquin (Neal Bell adaption of Zola) (1994)
Slavs! (Tony Kushner) 1995)
Faust (Randy Newman) (1995)
 Boy (Diana Son) (1996)
 Sweet Bird of Youth (1999)
 Our Town (2001)

Williamstown Theater Festival 
 Therese Racquin (1994)
 The Seagull (1995) 
 Tonight at 8:30 (2001)
 Strew Scene (2002)
 Once in a Lifetime (2003)
 Landscape of the Body (2004)
 The Cherry Orchard (2005)
 Three Sisters (2008)
 Far From Heaven (2011)

Broadway
Rent (1996)
Never Gonna Dance (2003)
Grey Gardens (2006)
Next to Normal (2009)
If/Then (2014)
Dear Evan Hansen (2016)
War Paint (2017)

Guthrie Theater
The Intelligent Homosexual's Guide to Capitalism and Socialism with a Key to the Scriptures (Tony Kushner) (2009)

Off-Broadway
New York Theatre Workshop
 70 scenes of Halloween (1986)
 RENT (1996) 
 Bright Lights, Big City (1998) 
 Cave-Dweller (2002)

The Public Theater
 Machinal (1990)
 A Bright Room Called Day (1991)
 Casanova (1991)
 Pericles (1992)
 Marisol (1994)
 Dogeaters (2001)
 Satellites (2006)
 The Intelligent Homosexual's Guide... (2010)
 Giant (2012)
 The Low Road (2018)

Signature Theatre
 A Few Stout Individuals (2002)
 Landscape of the Body (2006)
 Angels in America (2010)

Playwrights Horizons
 Spatter Pattern (2004)
 Grey Gardens (2006)
 Far From Heaven (2013)

Second Stage
 Spike Heels (1993)
 Next to Normal (2008)
 Boy's Life (2011)
 Dear Evan Hansen (2016)

References

External links

Biography, Playbill
Credits at Broadway.com
Biography as of November, 2006 at the American Theatre Wing

American theatre directors
Northwestern University School of Communication alumni
University of California, San Diego alumni

Living people

1959 births

Year of birth uncertain